Written in the Sand is the eighth full-length studio album recorded by the various M.S.G. lineups, the first group effort after the McAuley Schenker era. Re-energized by the short-lived reunion with UFO and by the recording of Walk on Water, Michael Schenker collected yet another group of players, composed of Leif Sundin on vocals, Shane Gaalaas on drums, and Barry Sparks on bass.

Track listing
All music by Michael Schenker, all lyrics by Leif Sundin.

"Brave New World" - 4:14   
"Cry No More" - 5:18   
"I Believe" - 5:48  
"Back to Life" - 6:12   
"Written in the Sand" - 3:28  
"Essenz" (instrumental) - 5:21     
"Love Never Dies" - 5:45    
"I Will Be There" - 5:03    
"Take Me Through the Night" - 6:08  
"Down the Drain" - 3:46   
"Sweet Cool Kiss of Night" (bonus track) - 4:30

Japanese edition
"Brave New World" - 4:14
"Essenz" (instrumental) - 5:21
"Cry No More" - 5:18
"Back to Life" - 6:12
"Written in the Sand" - 3:28
"Love Never Dies" - 5:45
"I Will Be There" - 5:03
"Take Me Through the Night" - 6:08
"Down the Drain" - 3:46
"I Believe" - 5:48
"Into The Arena" (live bonus track) - 3:56
"Cry For The Nations" (live bonus track) - 5:37

Personnel

Band members
Michael Schenker - lead & rhythm guitars
Leif Sundin - vocals
Barry Sparks - bass guitar
Shane Gaalaas - drums

Additional musicians
Claude Gaudette - keyboards

Production
Ron Nevison - producer, engineer, mixing

Charts

References

1996 albums
Michael Schenker Group albums
Albums produced by Ron Nevison